is a Japanese folk singer-songwriter. He has been called "Japan's Bob Dylan."

His childhood home was his father's church (established by William Merrell Vories, the founder of OMI Medical Supplies Corp). His current residence is Kameoka, Kyoto.  Originally a Christian, he began to doubt his family's work with juvenile delinquents and searched for an escape.  He threw himself into socialism, and after meeting folk singer Takashi Tomoya, he started to play guitar.

Career
After receiving his education at Oumikyoudai Middle School and Shiga Prefecture Ritsuyoukai City Senior High School, in 1966 Okabayashi entered the theology department of Doushisha College.

In 1968, he participated in the third "Folk Camp" in Tokyo. In September with Victor Records, he released "Sanya Blues", a song about living in Sanya with day laborers. In the following year he released singles such as "Friend," “The Letter," “The Tulip’s Applique" “The Fuck-Off Song," and "The Skeleton Song."  Because of the material in his songs, many of them were banned from broadcasting. He was called the "god of folk", but due to the Workers Music Council's strife, the pressure he felt from his surroundings to maintain his image, and the intentions of his own camp (he was already beginning to feel he had reached a dead end with his direct protest songs, and he was exploring with transitioning to rock as a solution), in May of the following year he temporarily disappeared from the public eye. His first album, Watashi wo danzai seyo (わたしを断罪せよ), was released by URC Records later that year.

In 1970, an unsigned band newly renamed Happy End started to play as Okabayashi's backing band and together they recorded his second album . However, 1971 was the last year of his headlining open-air concert in Hibya called the "Off-season Flowering Live Performance" as well as the last year of "Folk Jamboree" in which he participated. Thus, once again, Okabayashi disappeared from the stage.

In 1973, Okabayashi started his career back up and changed labels to Sony. He released rock albums such as "Golden Lion" and "Who Gives This Child Love." Songs containing Dylan-esque metaphors such as "Until That Daughter is Far Away" and "The 26 Numbers of Fall" were one part of his albums that were well received, but as usual, his fan's expectations were high. During the time these records were released, Okabayashi was removed several times from the list of guest performers at concerts, and eventually, Okabashi faced this consciousness by silencing himself by living in an agricultural community near Kyoto.

During this time he performed Enka. He collaborated with Misora Hibari on "The Moon of the Night Train." In 1975, Okabayashi changed labels to Columbia Music Entertainment, and following his "enka-stage,: released “A Copied Picture."  and performed a one-man concert. With Columbia he released two more albums, a self-titled compilation of his best hits and a self- narrated album called "Love Songs.”

In 1978 Okabayashi began working on his "Serenade" album he developed a strongly parody-flavored sound, which he dubbed his "new music-stage." Once again he was signed by his former label, Victor, and he strengthened his "new music-stage" with the songs "The Street is a Nice Carnival," “Storm," and "Graffiti." The songs that came to represent this period for Okabayashi were "Good-bye My Darling," “A Love Song to Lift You Up," and "Face the Mountain."  In 1980, he sang, "The Prayer of G," which was used as the ending theme song for the television drama "Hattorihanzou, The Shadow of the Army Corps" or "Shadow Warriors" which starred Sonny Chiba.

In the middle of the 1980s, having been dropped from the major record labels, he started the "Bare Knuckle Review" tour where he traveled all around Japan, in accompaniment with a guitar and a harmonica, singing in his former folk style. From this period on, he started singing songs that he was known for in his earlier days. Furthermore, during the same time he took on a Japanese folksong inspired rhythm, and created a unique rock genre he called "enyatto."  When searching for a new sound for this genre, he was enlightened when he first heard Korean procession instrument played in group called Samul Nori.  In 1987 he released and independent tape called "Dancing to Enyatto."  After that he released an album with Toshiba and performed a country-wide tour.

Because he heard that the "Old fans weren’t that happy," even though he was still in his "enyatto- stage," on October 20, 2007, he performed at the first "Off-Season Flowering Live Concert" in 36 years.  In 2010, Toshiba EMI release Okabayashi's cover song of Misora Hibari’s "Requiem – The Heart of Misora Hibari.”

References

Further reading
 James Dorsey, "Breaking Records: Media, Censorship, and the Folk Song Movement of Japan's 1960s," in Asian Popular Culture: New, Hybrid, and Alternate Media, ed. by John A. Lent and Lorna Fitzsimmons (Lanham, MD: Lexington Books, 2013), pgs. 79–107.

External links
アートライフ ミュージアムザネット 岡林信康（事実上の公式サイト）
EMI Music Japan　岡林信康（※音が出るので注意）
見る前に跳べ（ディスクユニオン社員のブログ）

Living people
1946 births
Japanese folk singers
Japanese guitarists
Japanese male singer-songwriters
Nippon Columbia artists
Musicians from Shiga Prefecture
20th-century Japanese male singers
20th-century Japanese singers